New Serbia, or Novoserbia was a military frontier of Imperial Russia from 1752 to 1764 subordinated directly to the Senat and Military Collegium.

The founder of New Serbia was Jovan Horvat. Horvat was a leader of a group which rejected a post-riot compromise reached after the demilitarization of their section of the Military Frontier. The rejected compromise envisaged transfer of those who want to remain warriors to the Banat Military Frontier while those who would remain in the region would get provincial status with preservation of religious autonomy. Contrary to serfs, Eastern Orthodox Serbs enjoyed substantial levels of autonomy (in exchange for providing forces to fight against the Ottoman Empire) granted in multiple documents starting with Statuta Valachorum, but which was gradually obsolete or eliminated by the creation of centralized modern state. The Horvat's colonization idea was enthusiastically supported by Elizabeth of Russia, and it was the first centrally planned settlement of the southern steppe which led to deterioration of Russian relations with Habsburg monarchy and Ottoman Empire and crystallization of the key features of the future Eastern Question.

The region was mostly located in the territory of present-day Kirovohrad Oblast of Ukraine, although some of its parts were located in the territory of present-day Cherkasy Oblast, Poltava Oblast and Dnipropetrovsk Oblast. The administrative centre of New Serbia was Novomirgorod (literally "New Mirgorod"), which is now Novomyrhorod, Ukraine.

History

The big territory of modern Ukraine, the Muscovite state was able to secure by signing of the Truce of Andrusovo and the 1686 Treaty of Perpetual Peace with the Polish-Lithuanian Commonwealth ignoring opinion of the local population. Until 1764–1775, the territory had an autonomous local government with limited sovereignty Cossack Hetmanate.
 
In 1751 (or in some sources 1750) the Russian envoy in Vienna Count Mikhail Petrovich Bestuzhev-Ryumin was contacted by colonel of the Austrian military Jovan Horvat with request to allow him and other Serbs to resettle in the Imperial Russia. They were Granichary (Grenz infantry) that used to protect the Austrian buffer territory "Vojna Krajina" (Military Borderland) from the Ottoman Turks.

The region was named after Serbs, who migrated in 1752 to the Russian Empire from the Military Frontier of the Habsburg monarchy. Russian authorities gave these Serbian settlers a land, which thus acquired its name, New Serbia soon after the War of the Austrian Succession. As the Pannonian Frontier, New Serbia was also organized into military province located on the Russian-Polish border and on the land of Buhogard palanka, Zaporizhian Sich. The purpose of the polity was protection of southern borders of the Russian empire as well as participation in Russian military operations near that region. Commandant of New Serbia was Jovan Horvat who vouched for his subordinates the Austrian Grenz infantry. The largest number of settlers came from the Serbian Hussar Regiment - because of its war merits. This unit had the same task as the Cossacks from Zaporozhye - the protection of the border area.

Demographics
Before the formation of New Serbia, its territory was mostly populated by Ukrainians and included 3,710 houses of settlers from the Hetmanate, Slobozhanshchina and Zaporizhia, 643 houses of native inhabitants and 195 houses of Ukrainian settlers from Poland and Moldavia. According to the memoirs of Serbian soldier and settler Aleksandar Piščević, their neighbors were Russians. When New Serbia was formed, the Russian senate ordered that all these settlers, except native inhabitants, must return to the places where they had previously lived.

After the formation of New Serbia, its initial new settlers were Serbs, but also many Moldavians and other Romanians (Mocani from Transylvania), Ukrainians, Bulgarians and others settled in the area.

Some of the original Ukrainian settlers who left the territory of New Serbia settled in the southern regions of modern-day Ukraine. In 1745, before the formation of New Serbia, its territory was populated by 9,660 inhabitants, while in 1754, the number of inhabitants was 3,989.

Because of the large number of Moldavian settlers, the largest ethnic group in the province in 1757 were not Serbs, but Moldavians. In 1757, the population of New Serbia numbered 5,482 inhabitants, including:
75.33% Moldavian Romanians
11.56% Serbs
13.11% others

Settlements

Settlements of New Serbia
In their new home, Serbs established new places, and consequently gave them same names such as the names of the places in their old home in the Pannonian Plain (in modern-day Serbia, Croatia, Romania and Hungary). Serbs also changed names of some older settlements, giving them Serbian names. Of the 41 settlements that existed in New Serbia, 26 were founded before arrival of the Serbs.

Notes:
(1.) Ukrainian and Russian names are given in Latin script transliterations.
(2.) These names were brought by Serbs from their old homeland in southern Pannonian Plain. Places with same names are also existing (or existed) in modern-day Serbia (Vojvodina), Croatia, Romania and Hungary.
(3.) The Serbian settlement of Turiya (Turija) was located in what sources are describing as a nominal Polish territory. The border between New Serbia and Poland was, however, often disputed and unstable.

Origin of settlement names
Places in New Serbia whose names can be also found in the territory of the Pannonian Plain (mostly in Vojvodina and Pomorišje) include:
Sombor, named after Sombor in Vojvodina, Serbia
Sentomash (Sentomaš), named after Sentomaš, modern Srbobran in Vojvodina, Serbia
Slankamin (Slankamen), named after Slankamen in Vojvodina, Serbia
Vershats (Vršac), named after Vršac in Vojvodina, Serbia
Subotitsa (Subotica), named after Subotica in Vojvodina, Serbia
Moshorin (Mošorin), named after Mošorin in Vojvodina, Serbia
Senta, named after Senta in Vojvodina, Serbia
Kanizh (Kanjiža), named after Kanjiža in Vojvodina, Serbia
Martonosh (Martonoš), named after Martonoš in Vojvodina, Serbia
Panchevo (Pančevo), named after Pančevo in Vojvodina, Serbia
Nadlak, named after Nădlac in Romania
Turiya (Turija), named after Turija in Vojvodina, Serbia
Vukovar, named after Vukovar in Croatia
Fedvar (Feldvar), named after Feldvar/Feldvarac, modern Bačko Gradište in Vojvodina, Serbia
Chongrad (Čongrad), named after Csongrád in Hungary
Zemun, named after Zemun, today part of Belgrade, in Serbia
Varazhdin (Varaždin), named after Varaždin in Croatia
Kovin, named after Kovin in Vojvodina, Serbia
Vilagosh (Vilagoš), named after Vilagoš, former Serbian name of modern Șiria in Romania
Becha (Bečej), named after Bečej in Vojvodina, Serbia
Semlik (Semlak), named after Semlac in Romania
Petroostriv (Petrovo Ostrovo), named after a place in Romania
Bechka (Pečka), named after Pecica in Romania
Mandorlak, named after a place in Romania
Glogovats (Glogovac), named after Glogovac in Serbia
Pavlish (Pavliš), named after Pavliš in Vojvodina, Serbia
Chonad (Čanad), named after Cenad in Romania
Sholmosh (Šoljmoš), named after Șoimoș in Romania

Gallery

In popular culture
In 2008 Babylon A.D. movie the main character Toorop (Vin Diesel) starts his way in the near future, in the post-apocalyptic 2027 in New Serbia, a territory of Russia.

See also
Jovan Horvat
Slavo-Serbia
Peter Tekeli
Jovan Šević
Jovan Albanez
Rajko Depreradović

Notes

References
Mita Kostić, Nova Srbija i Slavenosrbija, Novi Sad, 2001.
Pavel Rudjakov, Seoba Srba u Rusiju u 18. veku, Beograd, 1995.
Olga M. Posunjko, Istorija Nove Srbije i Slavenosrbije, Novi Sad, 2002.

External links
Nova Srbija i Slavenosrbija

Historical regions in Ukraine
Subdivisions of the Russian Empire
History of the Serbs
Romanians in Ukraine
States and territories established in 1752
1764 disestablishments
History of Kirovohrad Oblast
Novorossiya